Ahn Ji-hyun (born July 10, 1992) is a South Korean actress.

Filmography

Television series

Film

Music video

References

External links
 Ahn Ji-hyun  at Koom Entertainment 
 
 

1992 births
Living people
21st-century South Korean actresses
South Korean television actresses
South Korean film actresses
Actresses from Busan